Woodlands is an unincorporated community in Marshall County, West Virginia, United States. It was also known as Sisters Landing.

References 

Unincorporated communities in West Virginia
Unincorporated communities in Marshall County, West Virginia